Merrill Chapin Tenney (April 16, 1904 – March 18, 1985) was an American professor of New Testament and Greek and author of several books. He was the general editor of the Zondervan Pictorial Bible Dictionary, and served on the original translation team for the New American Standard Bible.

Background and education
Tenney was born April 16, 1904 in Chelsea, Massachusetts, to Wallace Fay Tenney and Lydia Smith Goodwin. He earned a diploma from Nyack Missionary Training Institute (1924), his Th.B. from Gordon College of Theology and Missions (1927), his A.M. from Boston University (1930), and his Ph.D. in Biblical and Patristic Greek from Harvard University (1944). He married Helen Margaret Jaderquist (1904–1978) in 1930, and together they had three sons, John Merrill (who died in childhood), Robert Wallace and Philip Chapin.

Academic career
Tenney briefly served as pastor of Storrs Avenue Baptist Church in Braintree, Massachusetts (1926–1928), and began teaching at Gordon College while still a student there. After graduation, he joined the faculty and was professor of New Testament and Greek until moving to Wheaton College in 1944, where he would eventually become dean of the graduate school from 1947 to 1971. Tenney was Henry Clarence Thiessen's chosen associate and (accordingly) an advocate of fundamentalism. He retired in 1977, but continued teaching as professor emeritus until 1982.

Legacy and death
In 1951, Tenney became the second president of the Evangelical Theological Society. In 1975, a volume of essays entitled Current Issues in Biblical and Patristic Interpretation was published in his honor. Tenney died in Wheaton on March 18, 1985.

Selected works

Books

as Editor

Articles and Chapters

References

Further reading

1904 births
1985 deaths
Writers from Chelsea, Massachusetts
American biblical scholars
Boston University alumni
Harvard Divinity School alumni
Wheaton College (Illinois) faculty
Translators of the Bible into English
New Testament scholars
20th-century translators